Kleidis Sokol Branica (born 10 May 1992) is an Albanian footballer who currently plays as a forward for KF Oriku in the Albanian First Division. Primarily a striker, he is a prolific goalscorer who is best known for his technique, creativity, strength, ability in the air. He finished the last campaign with Egnatia 15 goals. Branica surpassed his previous goalscoring feats to achieve a new personal best of 15 goals.

Personal life
He is the son of former Elbasani player and Shkumbini Peqin head coach Sokol Branica.

References

1992 births
Living people
People from Peqin
Association football forwards
Albanian footballers
KS Shkumbini Peqin players
KS Lushnja players
KS Egnatia Rrogozhinë players
KF Apolonia Fier players
KF Oriku players